Zanthoxylum leprieurii is a low branching medium-sized tree of the Rutaceae family. Some parts of the plant are used in African folk medicine.

Description
Leaves alternate, and are imparipinnately compound, with 8-17 leaflets. Leaflets are 15- long.

Distribution
This plant spans Tropical Africa, from Senegal to Ethiopia and reaches Mozambique.

Uses
Extracts from the stem and root bark have applications in traditional healing practices. They are used as part of a decoction to treat venereal diseases, body pain, dysentery, urinary infections, male impotence and intestinal worms. Leaf extracts are used as a topical wound treatment, kidney pain arthritis, bleeding gums and sores.

Though not known for its durability, its wood is used to build canoes and boats, drums, crates and boxes.

References

Flora of West Tropical Africa
leprieurii